The 2022–23 Utah Utes women's basketball team represented the University of Utah during the 2022–23 NCAA Division I women's basketball season. The Utes, led by eighth year head coach Lynne Roberts, played their home games at the Jon M. Huntsman Center and competed as members of the Pac-12 Conference.

Previous season
The Utes finished the season with a record of 21–12, and a 8–7 record in Pac-12 play to finish in sixth place. They advance to championship of the Pac-12 women's tournament where they lost to Stanford. They got an automatic bid to the NCAA Women's Tournament for the first time since 2011 where they defeat Arkansas in the first round which was their first win since 2009 before losing to Texas in the second round.

Departures

Incoming

Recruiting
There were no recruiting classing class of 2022.

Roster

Schedule and results 

|-
!colspan=9 style=| Exhibition

|-
!colspan=9 style=| Regular Season

|-
!colspan=9 style=| Pac-12 Women's Tournament

|-
!colspan=9 style=| NCAA Women's Tournament

Source:

Rankings
 

*The preseason and week 1 polls were the same.^Coaches did not release a week 2 poll.

Notes

See also
 2022–23 Utah Utes men's basketball team

References 

Utah Utes women's basketball seasons
Utah
Utah Utes
Utah Utes
Utah